Olcenengo (Osnengh in Piedmontese) is a comune (municipality) in the Province of Vercelli in the Italian region Piedmont, located about  northeast of Turin and about  northwest of Vercelli.

Olcenengo borders the following municipalities: Caresanablot, Casanova Elvo, Collobiano, Quinto Vercellese, San Germano Vercellese, and Vercelli.

References

Cities and towns in Piedmont